Jessica Asato is a British Labour Party politician. She was selected in 2012 as the parliamentary candidate for Norwich North at the 2015 general election. She was one of 15 Labour candidates each given financial support of £10,000 by Lord Oakeshott, the former Liberal Democrat, in January 2015. In the general election, Asato came second to Chloe Smith in Norwich North, having increased the Labour vote by 2% (Smith increased the Tory vote by more than 3%).

Personal and family life
She grew up in Gorleston and Rollesby where she lived with and cared for her grandmother, who had serious health problems, and went to Flegg High School in Great Yarmouth.  When she was 16 in 1997, she moved from Norfolk to live with her mother in London and went to Francis Holland School, an all-girls private school. She was a keen debater at Sixth Form level, reaching the semi-finals of the Oxford Union schools' debate competition. Asato studied at Trinity Hall, Cambridge, where she graduated with a degree in law. She was quickly divorced from her first husband, Howard Dawber, who stood as the Labour candidate for Bexleyheath and Crayford at the 2010 general election, whilst her second husband, journalist Gareth Butler, died of a heart attack in 2008. She married her third husband, Rob Chaplin, in 2014 and had a baby. She is a quarter Japanese and has family in Hawaii.

Political career
In 2009, Asato was ranked no 78 among the Top 100 most influential Left-wingers by The Daily Telegraph.

In 2010, she made The Independent'''s list of 10 names to watch, perhaps because she was "Social media lead" on David Miliband's leadership election campaign and was featured in the Total Politics video Make Your Mind Up (And Vote!) with Bucks Fizz and "famous political figures".

She was a councillor on Islington London Borough Council from 2010 to 2013, but resigned to spend more time in Norwich. She has been criticised in Islington by political opponents for spending too much time in Norfolk, and for allegedly being a "professional politician". She worked in Westminster two days a week as political adviser to former cabinet minister and culture secretary Tessa Jowell, and was featured as one of the Evening Standard's Lucky 13 in 2013. She is reported as saying that spending her formative years growing up in a low income household in Norfolk – from 11 until she left home at 16, and being the first person in her family to have made it to university - gives her a good foundation for life as an MP.

In Islington, she was chair of the Corporate Parenting Board. At the Labour Party Conference in 2014, she highlighted figures which she claimed showed there were 1,000 fewer childcare places in the East of England, that one in five parents had been forced to call in sick over the summer to look after their children and that child minder costs were up 44% in the last four years in the East of England.

In 2009, she wrote to the then Health Secretary Andy Burnham, raising concerns about his plans to make the NHS the "preferred provider" of NHS services. Asato was subsequently accused of hypocrisy for later supporting Clive Efford's anti-privatisation National Health Service (Amended Duties and Powers Bill).

On the 24th February 2023 she was selected by local party members as the parliamentary candidate for Waveney.

Employment
She was employed as a health policy researcher at the Social Market Foundation and was director of the Labour Yes! Campaign in favour of alternative vote plus. She was previously acting director of Progress, a director of Left Foot Forward and is vice-chairman of the Fabian Society. It has been suggested that under her directorship, Progress became less of a cheerleader group for Blairite politics than it was when it started.

She is Vice-Chair of the Electoral Reform Society and chair of governors of Jack Taylor Special School for children with disabilities and learning difficulties, and served as joint acting chair of Brook. She is on the advisory board of the European Institute for the Study of Contemporary Antisemitism.

PublicationsBy Choice, Not Chance: Fabian Facts for Socialists (with Howard Dawber and Paul Richards), Fabian Society 2001  Direct to Patient Communication: Patient Empowerment or NHS Burden? (editor), Social Market Foundation 2004   Charging Ahead?: Spreading the Costs of Modern Public Services'', Social Market Foundation, Oct 2007

References

Living people
Alumni of Trinity Hall, Cambridge
Labour Party (UK) councillors
Councillors in the London Borough of Islington
Labour Party (UK) parliamentary candidates
People educated at Francis Holland School
British people of Japanese descent
Chairs of the Fabian Society
Year of birth missing (living people)
Women councillors in England